Gideon Gibson Jr., (1731–1792) was a free man of color in the colony of South Carolina. He became a slaveholder and "regulator" in the back country. He supported their vigilantism to oppose British taxation policy.

In May 2011, he was discussed in the New York Times as a paternal great-grandfather of Randall Lee Gibson, a planter who served as a Confederate general from Louisiana. The senior Gibson was an example of mixed-race people who succeeded economically and over several generations moved into white society.

The American Revolution 
The principal opposition to the Stamp Act proposed by the British colonial authorities in 1764 and later repealed began in Massachusetts colony, which called on the other colonies to convene a convention of deputies in New York.

South Carolina became the first colony to second that motion, and the first to advance toward a continental union, long before the other colonies. This shift in popular opinion was of considerable influence to the other colonies, who were divided in their opinions of the propriety of such a cause. The war of the Regulation in North Carolina and Gibson's rebellion in South Carolina were the results of ordinary people defending what was seen as a just cause. They were against taxation without representation. When the colonial government in Charlestown rejected the petitions for redress of their courts by the bush country landowners, the seeds of the American Revolution were planted. By 1771 the tax skirmishes and imprisonment of various patriots had hardened into a rejection of British rule.

Loyalist Governor Lord Charles Montagu attempted to enforce the 1765 Stamp Act in South Carolina, which made him unpopular with the local colonists. He tried to encourage favor with the colonials and American rebels, selectively issuing pardons for some of the Regulators. By 1771 he had issued a full pardon for any actions taken by the regulators in his state (with the notable exception of Gideon Gibson Jr. and his followers.) Montague was recalled during the American Revolution.

Gibson was a planter and held slaves. When the British offered emancipation of slaves of rebels if they joined British lines, some regulators of both North and South Carolina decided to sit out the war. Lord Dunmore's Proclamation was the first mass emancipation of enslaved people in North American history.

Gibson, by then a colonel in the militia, was shot and killed by his nephew Maurice Murphy, in an argument.

See also 
 James Williams (Revolutionary War)

Further reading
Daniel J. Sharfstein, The Invisible Line: Three American Families and the Secret Journey from Black to White, Penguin Press, 2011

External links
 Paul Heinegg, Free African Americans of Virginia, North Carolina, South Carolina, Maryland and Delaware, 1995-2000, online text available
 G. Lloyd Johnson, "Gideon Gibson, the 'Regulator'"
 "Frontline: Gibson" The Blurred Racial Lines of Famous Families, (http://www.pbs.org/wgbh/pages/frontline/ shows/secret/famous/gibsonfamily.html), accessed 12/02/04

References 

1731 births
1771 deaths
Military history of the Thirteen Colonies
Pre-statehood history of North Carolina
Pre-statehood history of South Carolina
Tax resistance in the United States
1760s in the Thirteen Colonies
1770 in the Thirteen Colonies
1771 in the Thirteen Colonies
Conflicts in 1767
Vigilantes
Regulator Movement
Colonial South Carolina
Patriots in the American Revolution
People from South Carolina
People of pre-statehood South Carolina
People of South Carolina in the American Revolution
South Carolina colonial people